Sumar is an announced left-wing and progressive electoral platform for the 2023 Spanish general election, to be led by Spanish second deputy prime minister and labour minister Yolanda Díaz. The platform was provisionally registered as an association on 28 March 2022 and publicly unveiled on 18 May, though Díaz herself has stated that it may not be the platform's definitive name.

Background
As a result of Pablo Iglesias's departure from active politics in May 2021, Labour minister—and, from July 2021, second deputy prime minister—Yolanda Díaz, came to be widely regarded as Iglesias's presumptive successor as prime ministerial candidate in the next general election. Díaz expressed her will to shape a new electoral platform transcending political parties, as well as the Unidas Podemos brand, aiming to secure the support of ideologically-close forces such as En Comú Podem (ECP), Compromís and Más Madrid/Más País while giving a prevalent role to civil society.

The platform saw an advance unity act during an event to be held on 13 November 2021, with the participation of a number of women representative of the various political spaces that could eventually join it: Díaz herself, Barcelona mayor Ada Colau (ECP), Valencian vice president Mónica Oltra (Compromís), Madrilenian opposition leader Mónica García (Más Madrid) and Ceutan councillor Fatima Hamed (from the Movement for Dignity and Citizenship, MDyC); the absence of Podemos members in the event, most notably of Equality and Social Rights ministers Irene Montero and Ione Belarra, was seen as evidence of the growing diminished role of Unidas Podemos within the platform. Díaz-led incoming left-wing alliance was also well-received by incumbent prime minister Pedro Sánchez, who saw it as important for the "progressive space" to be in "top shape" in order for his government to be able to maintain and expand its majority in the next election. While the term "Broad Front" has been frequently used in the media to refer to Díaz's platform, it has been commeted that Díaz herself has rejected the use of this name for its connections with similar brandings used by left-wing populist alliances in Latin America.

After its postponement as a result of the international crisis sparked by the 2022 Russian invasion of Ukraine, it was announced on 18 May 2022 that Díaz's platform would go under the provisional name "Sumar", with its formal launch being scheduled for after the 2022 Andalusian regional election. Díaz herself has asserted that, while she feels comfortable with the "Sumar" concept, it may not be her platform's definitive name, depending on the administrative and bureaucratic processes. On 24 May, the platform's name and logo were registered in the Spanish Patent and Trademark Office.

References

2022 establishments in Spain
Political parties established in 2022
Progressivism
Left-wing politics in Spain